Hyper Battle '22 was a professional wrestling event produced by New Japan Pro-Wrestling (NJPW). It took place on April 9, 2022 in Tokyo at Ryōgoku Kokugikan. The event was named after the Hyper Battle events which originally took place from 1993 until 2004.

Storylines 
Hyper Battle '22 featured eight professional wrestling matches that involved different wrestlers from pre-existing scripted feuds and storylines. Wrestlers portrayed villains, heroes, or less distinguishable characters in the scripted events that built tension and culminated in a wrestling match or series of matches.

On March 27, 2022, Zack Sabre Jr. won the New Japan Cup for the second time after defeating Tetsuya Naito in the tournament final with Sabre challenging for the IWGP World Heavyweight Championship. The match between Sabre and the champion Kazuchika Okada for the title was made official the following day.

Results

References

2022 in Tokyo
2022 in professional wrestling
Events in Tokyo
New Japan Pro-Wrestling shows
Professional wrestling in Tokyo